Qian Shunying (September 9, 1924 – March 8, 2010), better known by her stage name Ouyang Sha-fei, was a Hong Kong actress.

She is known for her roles in Dragon Fist (1979), A Chinese Ghost Story II (1990), and Dream of the Red Chamber (1977).

Early life 
Ouyang was born in Suzhou, Jiangsu, Republic of China on September 9, 1924.

Acting career 
Ouyang was prolific actress; she famously starred in over 250 films in a 54-year period, between 1937 and 1991. At the age of 17, she began her acting career in several Mandarin movies in Shanghai. "Spy Number One" (1946) was her first successful movie. Ouyang made 17 films between 1951 and 1952, making her one of the busiest actresses in the Hong Kong film industry in her time. For most of the movies in her early career, she collaborated with her director and husband, Tu Guangqi. This partnership lasted until 1956.

In the early 1960s, Ouyang signed with the Shaw Brothers Studio. She exclusively acted in their films until the late 1970s. As her career matured in the late 1970s, Ouyang primarily took on roles of the mother or aunt in films and received two awards as the Best Supporting Role. While in Taiwan, she collaborated primarily with local Taiwanese TV networks. After returning to Hong Kong, she made cameos in many TV shows and movies and finally retired in 1990.

Personal life 
As Ouyang's acting career took off in the 1940s, she married her director, [[Tu Guangqi] also known as Doo Kwang Gee]. Her marriage was well-known after World War II. In the 1950s, the married couple escaped to Hong Kong to escape the political turmoil in China. They separated in 1956 and were divorced.

In 1979, she remarried her first husband Doo Kwang Gee and relocated to the United States. When her  spouse died the next year, she relocated to Taiwan. Ouyang later returned to Hong Kong.

After retiring in 1990, Ouyang relocated to the US for a few years and experienced a bad fall in 2009. Her health declined until she died of organ failure on August 5, 2010 and was buried in Salt Lake City, Utah, USA.

Filmography

Film 
Ouyang starred in over 250 films.

References 

1924 births
2010 deaths
20th-century Chinese actresses
20th-century Hong Kong actresses
Chinese television actresses
Hong Kong television actresses
Chinese film actresses
Hong Kong film actresses
Actresses from Suzhou
Hong Kong emigrants to the United States
People from Salt Lake City
Chinese emigrants to British Hong Kong